K. L. Puram or Kukalametta Lakshmipuram is a village in Vizianagaram district of Andhra Pradesh, India.

It is located on the National Highway 43 in the suburban area of Vizianagaram city towards Gajapathinagaram.

Demographics
 Indian census, the demographic details of K.L.Puram village is as follows:
 Total Population: 	1,764 in 393 Households.
 Male Population: 	908 and Female Population: 	856
 Children Under 6-years of age: 232 (Boys - 125 and Girls - 107)
 Total Literates: 	1,064

References

Villages in Vizianagaram district